Varvakios is the sixth studio album by American post-punk band Savage Republic. It was released on August 23, 2012 by LTM Recordings.

Track listing

Personnel
Adapted from the Varvakios liner notes.

Savage Republic
 Kerry Dowling – instruments
 Thom Fuhrmann – instruments, recording, design
 Ethan Port – instruments
 Alan Waddington – instruments
Additional musicians
 Blaine L. Reininger – violin

Production and additional personnel
 Ramona Clarke – design
 Bruce Licher – cover art
 Nick Paleologos – photography
 Savage Republic – production
 Don C. Tyler – mastering

Release history

References

External links 
 

2012 albums
Savage Republic albums